Kitchen Confidential is an American television sitcom that debuted on September 19, 2005, on the Fox network, based on Anthony Bourdain's New York Times bestselling book, Kitchen Confidential: Adventures in the Culinary Underbelly. Bradley Cooper played the lead character, Jack Bourdain, inspired by Anthony Bourdain.

After the show's first three episodes aired on Fox, the show was put on hiatus due to Fox's coverage of the Major League Baseball playoffs. In November 2005, Fox announced the show would not air during sweeps and that only 13 episodes would be produced because it was only averaging 4 million viewers. The show returned on December 5, 2005, with its fourth episode, but only received 3.38 million viewers. Four days later, Fox announced the cancellation of the series.

Cast

Main
 Bradley Cooper as Jack Bourdain – executive chef. Once addicted to alcohol and drugs, he is given the opportunity to run Nolita and make a career comeback.
 Nicholas Brendon as Seth Richman – pastry chef. An old friend of Jack who has feelings for Tanya, the hostess. He also has a jealousy issue.
 John Francis Daley as Jim – commis chef. Begs Jack to stay at Nolita so he doesn't have to go back to Utah. Later, he develops feelings for Tanya.
 Jaime King as Tanya – hostess. The clueless and trusting hostess at Nolita.
 Bonnie Somerville as Mimi – head waitress. The daughter of Pino, who hates the staff and tries to fit in. She later becomes the owner of Nolita. Mimi attended the Cornell University School of Hotel Administration.
 Owain Yeoman as Steven Daedalus – sous chef. Jack's best friend, but also a thief and womanizer.

Recurring
 John Cho as Teddy Wong – seafood chef
 Frank Langella as Pino – Nolita's owner
 Sam Pancake as Cameron – waiter
 Tessie Santiago as Donna – waitress
 Erinn Hayes as Becky Sharp – chef
 Frank Alvarez as Ramon – dishwasher

Episodes

DVD release
On May 22, 2007, 20th Century Fox released Kitchen Confidential: The Complete Series on DVD in Region 1. The 2-disc set contains all 13 episodes of the series as well as audio commentaries on the series premiere by Darren Star, David Hemingson and Bradley Cooper, on the series finale by Karine Rosenthal, David Hemingson, Bradley Cooper and Dean Lopata and two featurettes – "A Tour of the Nolita Restaurant" and "A Recipe for Comedy".

References

External links
 

2005 American television series debuts
2005 American television series endings
2000s American single-camera sitcoms
2000s American cooking television series
2000s American workplace comedy television series
English-language television shows
Fox Broadcasting Company original programming
Television shows based on non-fiction books
Television series by 20th Century Fox Television
Television series by Warner Bros. Television Studios
Television shows set in New York City
Television series by New Line Television
Television series set in restaurants